John Crampton (1701-1771) was an Anglican priest during the 18th century.
 
Crampton was born in Armagh and educated at Trinity College, Dublin. He was Prebendary of Kilmoylan in  Tuam Cathedral from 1733 to 1746; and Archdeacon of Tuam from then until his death in 1771.

He married Charlotte Twisleton, daughter of Fiennes Twisleton.

Notes

Alumni of Trinity College Dublin
18th-century Irish Anglican priests
Archdeacons of Tuam
People from Armagh (city)
1771 deaths
1701 births